Isaäc Dignus Fransen van de Putte (22 March 1822 – 3 March 1902) was a Dutch politician who briefly served as Prime Minister of the Netherlands in 1866, and as Minister of Colonial Affairs from 1863 to 1866 and 1872 to 1874.

Career 
Fransen van de Putte received training as an officer at the Royal Naval College in Medemblik and then worked for 10 years on the merchant ships of Rotterdam shipowner Anthony van Hoboken, where he rose to the position of mate. In 1849, he became an administrator at the sugar plantation Panji to Besuki on Java. 

He eventually returned to the Netherlands and became a member of parliament in 1862. After a year of Chamber membership, in 1863 he became Minister of Colonial Affairs. In his first term, he worked on the abolition of the Cultivation System.

In 1866, Fransen van de Putte had a disagreement with Johan Rudolph Thorbecke about colonial land policies. He joined Thorbecke's cabinet but was dismissed. In 1872, Fransen van de Putte returned to the cabinet of Gerrit de Vries. He served as a cabinet member during the Aceh War from 1873 to 1874. He and expedition commander Jan van Swieten criticized the often bloody and inhumane treatment of civilians, ranging from large-scale execution to deliberate destruction of livestock and rice fields in Sumatra.

He tried in vain to mediate the conflict between the king and his eldest son, William, Prince of Orange. This issue arose again in 1877 when he joined the cabinet of Jan Kappeyne van de Coppello. He asked that the ministry decide against the king before a wedding of the crown prince to Countess Mathilde van Limburg-Stirum. The former, however, did not go far.

Personal life 
On 28 March 1850, in Delft, Fransen van de Putte married Lucie Henriette Cornets de Groot. He is buried in the cemetery at Old Oak Dunes in The Hague. The Dutch ship  was named after him.

References

Footnotes

Bibliography

External links 
 Parlement.com biography 

1822 births
1902 deaths
Commanders of the Order of the Netherlands Lion
Dutch members of the Dutch Reformed Church
Members of the House of Representatives (Netherlands)
Members of the Senate (Netherlands)
Ministers of Colonial Affairs of the Netherlands
Ministers of the Navy of the Netherlands
People from Goes
Prime Ministers of the Netherlands